Thomas Blount may refer to:

Politicians
Thomas Blount (MP for Dorset), in 1376, MP for Dorset (UK Parliament constituency)
Thomas Blount (MP for Derbyshire), see Derbyshire (UK Parliament constituency) in 1420
Thomas Blount (MP for Bristol), see Bristol (UK Parliament constituency) in 1414
Thomas Blount (died 1568), MP for Worcestershire (UK Parliament constituency)
Thomas Blount (statesman) (1759–1812), American Revolutionary War veteran and US representative from North Carolina
Thomas Blount (inventor) (born c. 1604), English civil war soldier, inventor and MP for Kent

Others
Thomas Blount (died 1400), supporter of the English Richard II
Thomas Blount, English Catholic priest, martyred 1647
Sir Thomas Blount, 1st Baronet (1649–1687), English baronet
Thomas Blount, 3rd Earl of Newport  (died 1675)
Thomas Blount (lexicographer) (1618–1679), antiquarian and lexicographer
Thomas Blunt (optician) (?–1823), English scientific instrument maker